ISO/IEC 8859-16:2001, Information technology — 8-bit single-byte coded graphic character sets — Part 16: Latin alphabet No. 10, is part of the ISO/IEC 8859 series of ASCII-based standard character encodings, first edition published in 2001. The same encoding was defined as Romanian Standard SR 14111 in 1998, named the "Romanian Character Set for Information Interchange". It is informally referred to as Latin-10 or South-Eastern European. It was designed to cover Albanian, Croatian, Hungarian, Polish, Romanian, Serbian and Slovenian, but also French, German, Italian and Irish Gaelic (new orthography).

ISO-8859-16 is the IANA preferred charset name for this standard when supplemented with the C0 and C1 control codes from ISO/IEC 6429.
Microsoft has assigned code page 28606 a.k.a. Windows-28606 to ISO-8859-16.

Codepage layout
Differences from ISO-8859-1 have the Unicode code point number below the character.

Proposed ISO 8859-16

Originally, ISO 8859-16 was proposed as a different encoding similar to ISO 8859-1 with the missing French Œ œ (at the same spot as same place as DEC-MCS and Lotus International Character Set) and Ÿ (which was not at the same place as these sets, as Ý was in that spot for Icelandic), Dutch Ĳ ĳ, and Turkish Ğ ğ İ ı Ş ş. The euro sign did not exist at the time. This proposal was rejected.

References

External links
ISO/IEC 8859-16:2001
ISO/IEC 8859-16:2000 - 8-bit single-byte coded graphic character sets, Part 16: Latin alphabet No. 10 (draft dated November 15, 1999; superseded by ISO/IEC 8859-16:2001, published July 15, 2001)
ISO-IR 226 Romanian Character Set for Information Interchange (August 30, 1999, from Romanian Standard SR 14111:1998)
https://www.math.nmsu.edu/~mleisher/Software/csets/8859-16.TXT

ISO/IEC 8859
Computer-related introductions in 2001